Hümér Hültl was a Hungarian surgeon, noted for his work with surgical staples.

Life 
Hümér Hültl was born on July 14, 1868 in Felsőbánya. He is buried in Kerepesi Cemetery in Budapest.

Legacy 
Hültl is known for his work with surgical staples. In 1908, he pioneered the technique in gastrointestinal surgery, using a stapler designed by Victor Fischer. Aladár von Petz innovated further upon Hültl and Fischer's stapler, and the technique is in wide use today.

References 

Hungarian surgeons
1868 births
1940 deaths